Yuliya Vyacheslavovna Tarasenko (née Bronnikova, ; born 21 January 1984) is a Russian ski orienteering competitor. In 2013, she won a world title in the relay and a European title in the middle distance. Tarasenko teaches ski orienteering at the Academy of Winter Sports and at the Siberian Federal University in Krasnoyarsk. She has a son, born in 2010. Her husband is also a competitive ski orienteerer.

References

1984 births
Living people
Russian orienteers
Female orienteers
Ski-orienteers